The Love of the Bajadere is a 1926 German silent film directed by Géza von Bolváry and starring Helene von Bolváry.

Cast

References

Bibliography

External links

1926 films
Films of the Weimar Republic
German silent feature films
Films directed by Géza von Bolváry
UFA GmbH films
Films set in the British Raj
German black-and-white films